Pushing the Envelope is the twelfth studio album by saxophone player Gerald Albright. It was nominated for Best Pop Instrumental Album at the 53rd Annual Grammy Awards in 2011.

Guests
Guests on the album include:
Fred Wesley on track 1
Earl Klugh on track 6
George Duke on track 8

Track listing 
All songs written by Gerald Albright, except where noted.
 "What Would James Do?" - 5:32 (featuring Fred Wesley)
 "Get on the Floor" (Michael Jackson, Louis Johnson) - 4:56
 "Bobo's Groove" - 5:02
 "Capetown Strut" - 4:52
 "Close to You" (Burt Bacharach, Hal David) - 4:57
 "I Found the Klugh" - 5:36 (featuring Earl Klugh)
 "Embrace the Spirit" - 6:01
 "The Road to Peace [A Prayer for Haiti]" - 5:10 (featuring George Duke)
 "Highway 70" - 4:53
 "From the Soul" - 5:40

2010 albums

Personnel 
 Gerald Albright – alto saxophone (1-4, 6-10), baritone saxophone (1-4, 6, 7, 9, 10, tenor saxophone (1-4, 6-10), keyboards (1, 4, 6, 7, 8), bass guitar (1, 2, 3, 5-8, 10), drum programming (1), synthesizer programming (2, 3), EWI controller (2, 3, 4, 6, 7, 9), backing vocals (4), synthesizers (5), soprano saxophone (5, 8), percussion programming (6, 8)
 Tracy Carter – keyboards (1-5, 7-10)
 Luther Hanes – keyboards (6)
 George Duke – acoustic piano (8)
 Rick Watford – guitars (1, 2, 3, 6-10)
 Earl Klugh – acoustic guitar (6)
 Ricky Lawson – drums (2-10)
 Fred Wesley – trombone (1)
 Mark Cargill – string section (2, 5), string arrangements and conductor (2, 5)
 Selina Albright – backing vocals (2, 5)

Production 
 Mark Wexler – executive producer 
 Gerald Albright – producer, arrangements, recording 
 Yuya Morishita – drum recording (2-10)
 Greg Cook – string recording (2, 5)
 Erik Zobler – piano recording (8)
 Don Murray – mixing 
 Sangwook "Sunny" Nam – mastering 
 Larissa Collins – art direction 
 Albert J. Roman – cover design 
 Lori Stoll – photography 
 Steve Chapman and Chapman Management – management 

Studios
 Recorded at Bright Music Studios (Castle Rock, Colorado).
 Drums recorded at Ahhsum Studios (West Covina, California).
 Strings recorded at CCI Media (Torrance, California).
 Piano recorded at LeGonks West (Hollywood, California).
 Mixed at G Studio Digital (Studio City, California).
 Mastered at The Mastering Lab (Ojai, California).